Samogitian Wikipedia is a section of Wikipedia in Samogitian language. This section of Wikipedia was founded in 2006 by initiative of Zords Davini (Arnas Udovičius). It has  articles.

History 
Number of article milestones:
 2006, 25 March — 1.
 2007, 9 February — 1 000.
 2008, 24 January — 5 000.
 2009, 14 April — 10 000.
 2016, 23 February — 15 000
 2017, 29 January — 16 000.
 2022, 17 June — 17,077.

References

External links 
 
 IT: kiekybe lietuviškoji «Vikipedija»(стр. 50-51)

Wikipedias by language
Samogitia
Internet properties established in 2006